James Gilbert was a Scottish professional footballer who played in the Scottish League for Heart of Midlothian as a centre forward.

Personal life 
Gilbert served as a bombardier in the Royal Garrison Artillery during the First World War.

Career statistics

References 

Scottish footballers
Scottish Football League players
British Army personnel of World War I
Heart of Midlothian F.C. players
Association football forwards
Year of birth missing
Year of death missing
Place of birth missing
Royal Garrison Artillery soldiers
Scottish military personnel